Lintlaw is a village in the Canadian province of Saskatchewan within the Rural Municipality of Hazel Dell No. 335 and Census Division No. 9. The village is located at the intersection of Highway 49 and Highway 617, 142 km northwest of the City of Yorkton.

History 
Lintlaw incorporated as a village on December 14, 1921.

Demographics 

See also

 List of communities in Saskatchewan
 Villages of Saskatchewan

References
10.  Census Profile, 2021 Census of Population February 9, 2022. Retrieved February 18, 2022.

Villages in Saskatchewan
Hazel Dell No. 335, Saskatchewan
Division No. 9, Saskatchewan